Lendas Encantadas is the fourth album by Brazilian progressive rock band Apocalypse. It's a reissue of their first work (available in LP format only, titled Apocalypse) with all lyrics in Portuguese. The difference is that one track was completely re-recorded ("Sozinho, Perdido Dentro de Mim") and the guitar parts are added to this CD. Three bonus tracks recorded in 1992–1993 ("Mesmo que não Haja Nada", "Levando a Vida" and "Chamando por Ajuda – Crying for Help – Portuguese version") were also included.

Track listing
 Miragem
 Virada do Século 
 Sombra do Meu Ser 
 Sentinela 
 Luzes da Vida 
 Sozinho Perdido Dentro de Mim 
 Caçador de Máquinas 
 Mesmo que não Haja Nada
 Chamando por Ajuda 
 Levando a Vida

Personnel 
 Eloy Fritsch: Piano, organ, moog, Vocoder, vocals
 Ruy Fritsch: Electric and acoustic guitars, vocals
 Chico Fasoli: Drums, percussion, vocals
 Chico Casara: Lead Vocal, Bass guitar

References

1997 albums
Apocalypse (band) albums